Lampsilis virescens, the Alabama lamp naiad, Alabama lamp pearly mussel or Alabama lampmussel, is a species of freshwater mussel, an aquatic bivalve mollusk in the family Unionidae, the river mussels.

This species is endemic to the United States.  This river mussel is currently limited to the Paint Rock River drainage in northeastern Alabama.

This mussel grows up to 6 centimeters long and is straw-colored or greenish and smooth and shiny.

References

Endemic fauna of Alabama
Critically endangered fauna of the United States
virescens
Bivalves described in 1858
ESA endangered species
Taxonomy articles created by Polbot